The following table shows the linguistic composition of each Hungarian county according to the Hungarian Census of 1910

This article is a list of census data of counties in the Kingdom of Hungary during the time period between 1715 and 1910.
The list contains only 39 counties of the total 72 counties of pre Trianon Hungary.

Census data of Hungary (proper)

(The data doesn't include the population of the counties of present-day Hungary)

Abaúj-Torna
1910 census (population by language)

Alsó-Fehér
1910 census (population by language)

Arad
1910 census (population by language)

Árva
1910 census (population by language)

Bács-Bodrog
1715 census

1720 census

1820 census

1910 census (population by language)

Baranya
1910 census (population by language)

Bars
1910 census (population by language)

Beszterce-Naszód
1910 census (population by language)

Fogaras
1910 census (population by language)

Hunyad
1910 census (population by language)

Kis-Küküllő
1910 census (population by language)

Kolozs
1910 census (population by language)

Krassó-Szörény
1910 census (population by language)

Liptó
1910 census (population by language)

Máramaros
1910 census (population by language)

Moson
1910 census (population by language)

Nagy-Küküllő
1910 census (population by language)

Nyitra
1910 census (population by language)

Pozsony
1910 census (population by language)

Sáros
1910 census (population by language)

Szeben
1910 census (population by language)

Szepes
1869 census

1900 census

1910 census

Szilágy
1910 census (population by language)

Szolnok-Doboka
1910 census (population by language)

Temes
1910 census (population by language)

Torda-Aranyos
1910 census (population by language)

Torontál
1910 census (population by language)

Trencsén
1910 census (population by language)

Turóc
1910 census (population by language)

Ung
1910 census (population by language)

Zólyom
1910 census (population by language)

Croatia-Slavonia

Bjelovar-Križevci
1910 census (population by language)

Lika-Krbava
1910 census (population by language)

Modruš-Rijeka
1910 census (population by language)

Požega
1910 census (population by language)

Syrmia
1910 census (population by language)

Varaždin
1910 census (population by language)

Virovitica
1910 census (population by language)

Zagreb
1910 census (population by language)

See also
Demographics of Hungary
Demographic history of Syrmia

References

Sources
Révai Nagy Lexikona Encyclopedia of Révai (1911)

External links
1910 Maps of the counties 
1910 Maps of Counties of the Hungarian Kingdom (1913) from Talmamedia.com

 
Geography of the Kingdom of Hungary
Kingdom of Hungary
Kingdom of Hungary